Chengdu Taste is a chain of Chinese restaurants from Southern California. The business operates in Houston, Los Angeles, and Seattle, among other locations.

The location in the San Gabriel Valley (SGV) has been called "the crown jewel of Szechuan cuisine in the SGV". Danny Chau, writer for The Ringer, said it was his favorite Sichuan restaurant in Los Angeles. It has also been called the best Sichuan restaurant in America by J. Kenji López-Alt writing for Serious Eats.

See also 

 List of Chinese restaurants
 List of restaurant chains in the United States

References

Further reading

External links
 

Chinatown–International District, Seattle
Chinese restaurants in Seattle
Chinese restaurants in California
Restaurant chains in the United States
Restaurants in Houston
Asian restaurants in Los Angeles
Chinese restaurants in Texas